The 2016 Tulsa Golden Hurricane football team represented the University of Tulsa in the 2016 NCAA Division I FBS football season. The Golden Hurricane played their home games at Skelly Field at H. A. Chapman Stadium in Tulsa, Oklahoma, and competed in the West Division of American Athletic Conference (AAC). They were led by second-year head coach Philip Montgomery. They finished the season 10–3, 6–2 in America Athletic play to finish in second place in the West Division. They were invited to the Miami Beach Bowl where they defeated Central Michigan.

Before the season

Transfers out / departures
QB Jabe Burgess transferred to Mississippi Gulf Coast Community College in January 2016. RB Kyle McLaughlin transferred to Missouri Southern. OT Mildren Montgomery transferred to Texas Southern. WR Blake Kitrell transferred to Washburn. DB J. R. Reed transferred to Georgia.

Schedule
Tulsa announced its 2016 football schedule on February 9, 2016. The 2016 schedule consists of 6 home and away games in the regular season. The Golden Hurricane will host AAC foes Cincinnati, East Carolina, SMU, and Tulane, and will travel to Houston, Memphis, Navy, and Central Florida (UCF).

The team will play four non–conference games, two of which are home games against North Carolina A&T from the Mid-Eastern Athletic Conference and San Jose State from the Mountain West Conference, and two road game against Fresno State from the Mountain West Conference and travel to Ohio State.

Game summaries

San Jose State

at Ohio State

North Carolina A&T

at Fresno State

SMU

at Houston

Tulane

at Memphis

East Carolina

at Navy

at UCF

Cincinnati

Central Michigan–Miami Beach Bowl

Roster

References

Tulsa
Tulsa Golden Hurricane football seasons
Miami Beach Bowl champion seasons
Tulsa Golden Hurricane football